Disney's Children's Favorite Songs, Volume 1 is a record containing 25 classic children's songs. The songs are performed by Larry Groce and The Disneyland Children's Sing-Along Chorus (Choral Director: Betty Joyce). The record was produced in 1979 by Jymn Magon, and engineered by George Charouhas for Walt Disney Records. It was released in 1979 by Disneyland Records and in 2006 by Walt Disney Records. Distributed by Buena Vista Pictures Distribution, Inc.

Track listing
All songs are public domain except where listed.

"This Old Man (Nick Nack Paddy Whack)"
"I've Been Working on the Railroad"
"Three Blind Mice"
"Oh, Susanna" (Stephen Foster)
"The Man on the Flying Trapeze"
"Jimmy Crack Corn"
"The Mail Must Go Through (from the Disneyland/Golden Book Read-Along The Seven Little Postmen)" (Larry Groce)
"Home on the Range"
"It Ain't Gonna Rain No More"
"A Bicycle Built for Two (Daisy, Daisy)"
"Mary Had a Little Lamb"
"Take Me Out to the Ball Game"
"Friends Lullaby (from the Disneyland/Golden Book Read-Along The Lively Little Rabbit)" (Larry Groce)
"Old MacDonald Had a Farm"
"The Hokey Pokey" (Larry LaPrise, Charles Macak and Taftt Baker)
"She'll Be Coming 'Round the Mountain"
"Ten Little Indians"
"The Green Grass Grew All Around"
"In the Good Old Summer Time"
"Animal Fair"
"Row, Row, Row Your Boat"
"I'm a Policeman (from the Disneyland/Golden Book Read-Along The Fat Little Policeman)" (Larry Groce)
"Pop Goes the Weasel"
"Dixie" (Dan Emmett)
"Twinkle, Twinkle, Little Star"

References

1979 compilation albums
Disneyland Records compilation albums
Children's music albums